Marzieh is a Persian feminine given name. In Dari Persian it is pronounced as Marzia.

Marzieh is the name of:

Marzieh (singer) (1924–2010), Tehran-born singer of Persian traditional music
Marzieh Afkham (born 1962), Iranian diplomat
Marzieh Boroumand (born 1951), Iranian actress and screenwriter
Marzieh Hadidchi (1939-2016), Iranian activist and politician
Marzieh Meshkini (born 1969), Iranian cinematographer, film director and writer
Marzieh Rasouli, Iranian journalist
Marzieh Shah-Daei (born 1962), Iranian official and manager
Marzieh Sotoudeh (born 1957), Iranian Canadian writer and translator
Marzieh Vahid-Dastjerdi (born 1959), Iranian university professor and former parliamentarian and the first woman to be a minister after Islamic revolution
Marzieh Vafamehr, Iranian actress living in Tehran

Persian feminine given names